KMXL (95.1 FM) is an American radio station serving the Joplin, Missouri, metropolitan area and is one of the top rated Adult Hits stations in the nation.  Having an effective radiated power of 50,000 watts, KMXL puts out a city-grade signal across the entire metro area.  The station is owned by Carthage Broadcasting Company, Inc., and features programming from Westwood One.

KMXL broadcasts under the "Mike FM" trade name, as does WHZZ in Lansing and several other U.S. and Canadian radio stations.

References

External links

MXL
Adult hits radio stations in the United States